Asurabandha is a village/Grama Panchayat under Surada Block of Ganjam district in the state Odisha, India. It consists of 29 villages.

Villages under Asurabandha Grama Panchayat 
1. Asurabandha, 2. Balasi, 3. Bhagabanpur, 4. Dantalingi, 5. Dhepapalli, 6. Dullada, 7. Ganjana, 8. Gobindapur, 9. Gunduribadi, 10. Kaithapalli, 11. Kathagada, 12. Kharikuti, 13. Liundi, 14. Maniakati, 15. Mayangi, 16. Mentiamba, 17. Murgapalli, 18. Nahaganda, 19. Padareisuni, 20. Paniamba, 21. Parasuramnagar, 22. Patapalli, 23. Rumapalli, 24. Sahanaganda, 25. Sanakharikotti, 26. Sandhabali, 27. T.D.Gochha, 28. Tala Dantilingi, 29. Upara Dantilingi

Educational Institutions 

 Ashramika High School, Asurabandha, Estd: 1985
 Upper Primary School, Asurabandha, Estd: 1965
 Nodal Upper Primary School, Dantalingi, Estd: 1918
 Nodal Upper Primary School, Bhagabanpur, Estd: 1925
 Nodal Upper Primary School, Dhepapalli, Estd: 1967
 Primary School, Asurabandha, Estd: 1914
 Primary School, Maniakathi, Estd: 1945
 Primary School, Mayangi, Estd: 1954
 Primary School, Gobindapur, Estd: 1956
 Primary School, Padareisuni, Estd: 1958
 Primary School, Gundiribadi, Estd: 1959
 Primary School, T.D.Gochha, Estd: 1961
 Primary School, Dullada, Estd: 1989
 Project Primary School, Kathagada, Estd: 2008
 Project Primary School, Rumapalli, Estd: 2008

Worship Places

Hindu 
 Maa Kandhuni Devi Temple, Padareisuni
 It has very beautiful atmospheric surrounding at the temple side. Maa Kandhuni Devi was the tutelary deity of "Surada Royal Family". So, Raja Sandhadhanu Singh was also established Maa Kandhuni Devi's temple at Surada for daily worship purpose.

Christian 
 Dantilingi Church, Dantilingi
 This is a big church at the Dantilingi village. Every year a special worship is done in accordance to "Mother Lurdu Marry". She was very helpful for this local people and gave blessings for prosperity.

Villages in Ganjam district